Xing Yan'an (born 17 June 1983 in Zibo, Shandong) is a Chinese track and field athlete who has competed in sprinting and hurdling.

He represented his country in the 4x100 metres relay event at the 2008 Summer Olympics.

He set a new personal best in the 100 m in May 2009, finishing third at the Chinese national championships with a time of 10.38 seconds.

He won the relay bronze medal for Beijing at the 11th Chinese National Games in 2009 along with Zhang Peimeng.

References

Team China 2008
Athlete Biography Beijing 2008

External links

1983 births
Living people
Athletes (track and field) at the 2008 Summer Olympics
Chinese male sprinters
Chinese male hurdlers
Olympic athletes of China
Sportspeople from Zibo
Runners from Shandong